Shen Jianqiang (born 5 August 1964) is a Chinese former swimmer who competed in the 1984 Summer Olympics, in the 1988 Summer Olympics, and in the 1992 Summer Olympics. Zhou Ming was his coach during the peak of his swimming career.

References

1965 births
Living people
Chinese male butterfly swimmers
Chinese male freestyle swimmers
Olympic swimmers of China
Swimmers at the 1984 Summer Olympics
Swimmers at the 1988 Summer Olympics
Swimmers at the 1992 Summer Olympics
Asian Games medalists in swimming
Swimmers at the 1986 Asian Games
Swimmers at the 1990 Asian Games
Asian Games gold medalists for China
Asian Games silver medalists for China
Asian Games bronze medalists for China
Medalists at the 1986 Asian Games
Medalists at the 1990 Asian Games
Universiade medalists in swimming
Universiade gold medalists for China
Medalists at the 1991 Summer Universiade
20th-century Chinese people